Family of Medium Tactical Vehicles is a series of US military vehicles manufactured derived from the Austrian military truck Steyr 12M18

FMTV may also stand for:
Food Matters TV, an online streaming health & wellness channel founded in 2014
 Follow Me TV, a digital television channel of Formosa Television